Aimery X de Rochechouart (died 1269), was a French noble.

He was the eldest son of Aimery IX de Rochechouart and Jeanne de Tonnay. He was known to be dead by 1269. His widow remarried Reginald FitzPiers, Lord of Blenlevenny.

Marriage and issue
Aimery married Joan, widow of Ingram de Percy, she was the daughter and heir of William de Fortibus and Maud de Ferrers. They are known to have had the following known issue.
Aimery XI de Rochechouart, married Germasie de Pons, without issue.
Jeanne de Rochechouart, married Pons de Mortagne, had issue.

References
Aubert de La Chesnaye Desbois, François Alexandre. Dictionnaire de la noblesse ... de France; 2nd ed. 1778.

Year of birth unknown
1269 deaths
13th-century French people
 House of Rochechouart